Star Premium (formerly known as Fox+ and Fox Premium) was a multiplex suite of premium Latin American subscription television channels owned by The Walt Disney Company Latin America. The network competed with HBO Latin America and its programming consisted mostly of non-dubbed movies and series with Spanish and Portuguese subtitles.

The network ceased broadcasting on February 1, 2022, in Spanish-speaking Latin America and on March 31, 2022, in Brazil with content being available on Star+ streaming service launched by Disney in the region.

History
The network was launched in Latin America, excluding Brazil, on June 1, 1997, by LAPTV, a joint-venture between Universal Pictures, Metro-Goldwyn-Mayer, Fox Entertainment Group and Paramount Pictures. In 2013 LAPTV was integrated into Fox International Channels Latin America and the channel package was renamed the following year as Fox+ and later as Fox Premium. The suite was renamed Star Premium on February 22, 2021, as Disney de-emphasized use of the Fox brand.

In 2012, the channels were rebranded and aligned under Moviecity brand name.

MovieCity (founded in 1997), became MovieCity Premieres
CityMix (1997), became MovieCity Hollywood
CityStars (2004), became MovieCity Classics
CityVibe (2007), became MovieCity Action
CityFamily (2009), became MovieCity Family
CityMundo (2011), became MovieCity Mundo

The first five channels also were launched in high definition in 2012, along with video on demand and Internet streaming being added, though they lost Universal Pictures films after HBO gained the rights to their films. Fox Latin America purchased the CineCanal and MovieCity networks in 2009. LAPTV itself was integrated into FLA itself in 2013.

In 2014, Fox International Channels Latin America announced the re-branding of the MovieCity multiplex as Fox+, along with the streaming service Fox Play+. Another network, Fox Comedy, was also established.

The network was launched in Brazil in February 2016 with 2 channels, along with rebrand of  MovieCity as Fox 1 and MovieCity Action as Fox Action. The network became simply Fox Premium on March 11, 2017, with Fox 1 again rebranded to Fox Premium Series.

On November 27, 2020, Disney announced that they would rebrand the Fox branded channels in Latin America to Star on 22 February 2021, as it pushed the Star branding from regional Asian use to worldwide outside of North America. Though the rebranding of these networks would be short-lived, it saved Disney brand licensing fees to Fox Corporation for the continued use of the Fox trademark on active television networks.

With the changes made by Disney of the closure of 100 networks worldwide, including Latin America, in addition to the launch of Star+ in the region that took place on August 31, 2021, the channels were discontinued on January 31, 2022, as well as Fox Sports in South America and several other networks at the end of March in the region.

Channels

Spanish-speaking Latin America & Caribbean

Brazil
 Star Hits (formerly Fox 1 & Fox Premium 1)
 Star Hits 2 (formerly Fox Action & Fox Premium 2)

References

Premium
Television channels and stations established in 1997
Television channels and stations disestablished in 2022
Former subsidiaries of The Walt Disney Company
Defunct television channels
Latin American cable television networks
Spanish-language television stations
Portuguese-language television stations in Brazil
The Walt Disney Company Latin America